You're for Me is an album by American country music artist Buck Owens, released in 1962.

It was re-issued in 1995 by Sundazed Records with two bonus tracks.

Track listing
 "You're for Me" (Tommy Collins, Buck Owens) – 2:15
 "Fool Me Again" (Dusty Rhodes, Rolly Weber) – 2:36
 "Down on the Corner of Love" (Owens) – 2:22
 "Mexican Polka" (Owens) – 2:08
 "Mirror, Mirror on the Wall" (Owens, Don Rollins) – 2:12
 "Bad Bad Dream" (Owens) – 2:30
 "Under the Influence of Love" (Harlan Howard, Owens) – 2:21
 "Nobody's Fool But Yours" (Owens) – 2:30
 "House Down the Block" (Owens) – 2:29
 "Country Polka" (Owens) – 2:14
 "Down to the River" (Owens) – 2:51
 "Blues for Life" (Owens) – 2:20
1995 reissue bonus tracks:
 "Under the Influence of Love" (Howard, Owens) – 2:22
 "You're for Me" (Collins, Owens) – 2:14

Recorded
May 24, 1961, Capitol Recording Studio, Hollywood (6,7,8)
Sept 26, 1961, Capitol Recording Studio, Hollywood (1,9)
Dec 5, 1961, Capitol Recording Studio, Hollywood (5)
Jan 1962, Capitol Recording Studio, Hollywood (2,3,4,10,11,12)

References

1962 albums
Buck Owens albums
Capitol Records albums
Albums recorded at Capitol Studios